The Baylor Project is an American jazz duo from New York City. Its members are husband and wife Marcus and Jean Baylor.

Marcus Baylor is from St. Louis, Missouri and was previously the drummer for The Yellowjackets. Jean Baylor was previously a member of R&B group Zhané. They released their debut album, The Journey, on Be A Light Records in 2017. In 2021, they released a second album, Generations. Later that year, they joined the roster at Motown Music Group. They have been nominated for four Grammy Awards including twice for Best Jazz Vocal Album for The Journey and Generations twice for Best Traditional R&B Performance for the song "Laugh and Move On" and "Sit On Down. Generations won the NAACP Image Award for Outstanding Vocal Jazz Album.

References

American jazz ensembles from New York City
American musical duos
Musical groups from New York City
Jazz musicians from New York (state)